Jung Joon Young 1st mini album is the self-titled debut EP by South Korean rock singer, Jung Joon-young, released by CJ E&M on October 10, 2013. It consists of six songs containing a pre-released track "병이에요 (Spotless Mind)", the title track, "이별 10분 전 (The Sense of an Ending)", and two songs that he participated in writing and composing: "아는 번호 (Missed Call)" and "Take off Mask" and other two songs "정말? (Really?)", and "Be Stupid".

His 1st Mini Album did well; The album ranked the top spot both on the daily and weekly chart of Synnara Record as a bestselling album during its first week and it totally sold over 12,804 copies from October until the end of 2013 in Korea. Plus, "병이에요 (Spotless Mind)" landed at the third place and "이별 10분전 (The Sense of an Ending)" also took the second place on the chart of MBC's music show 음악중심  (Music Core).

Jung Joon-young received New Male Solo Artist for "이별 10분전 (The Sense of an Ending)" at the 3rd Gaon Chart K-Pop Awards.

Background and release
On April 21, 2013, it was announced that CJ E&M signed with Jung Joon Young on April 20 and they were supposed to release his debut album at the earliest that summer of the year. 
However it was delayed until October due to his passion to make it perfect and it was referred that it took a pretty long time for him to select the best songs he could be satisfied with.

It was described that he participated actively in producing his 1st Mini Album especially making N version of "병이에요 (Spotless Mind)" MV and album photos through the reality show Be Stupid.

On Oct 01, 2013. Jung Joon-young released his single "Spotless Mind", a pre-released title track off his upcoming album, along with two versions of the music video ("N" version and "S" version).
Just an hour after release, "Spotless Mind" immediately made an impact on the country's charts and nabbed the top spot on Mnet and Bugs, and Soribada.

Soon after, finally his 1st Mini Album was released on October 10 of that year.

Promotion
Jung Joon-young unveiled the detailed story behind the making of his album and the great effort for working on his album through On Style's reality show, "Jung Joon-young's Be Stupid" which aired four episodes from Sep 10 to Oct 1, 2013.

On October 4, he revealed the track list of lst Mini Album through the graffiti mural on a wall near Hongik University with the help of art students.

On Oct 10, he held a showcase to celebrate the release of his 1st Mini Album, and started his official activities as a singer follow up by making his debut show performance of the title track "이별 10분전 (The Sense of an Ending)" through Mnet’s "M Countdown".
He promoted the title track "이별 10분전 (The Sense of an Ending)", along with the track "병이에요 (Spotless Mind)" on music shows such as Mnet's M! Countdown, KBS's Music Bank and MBC's Show! Champion from October 10 to November 12.

He met many fans through signing events not only domestically but also abroad. He visited Taiwan in order to promote his first mini album on December 8, 2013 and held a fan meeting with 1,000 Taiwanese fans and had an autograph-signing event with his song performances for those who had purchased a special limited edition of his album.

Composition and singles
It was reported that he devoted much effort and time to his first mini-album. Not just the vocals, but with the sound, album design, music videos. He attended  many meetings with the staff to include his unique colors into the album. So he mentioned that "I hope that people will be able to see every side to the album, and not just the title song and pre-released song" through the interview with YesAsia.
According to his agency CJ E&M, "We have paid special attention to the sound of the album. In contrast to the mechanical sound that is currently in, we gathered some of the best engineers in Korea into the studio, and went for a sound that makes you feel like you’re listening to live music. Colorful rock music with a high quality sound is the core of this album."

Pre-released single : "병이에요 (Spotless Mind)"

"병이에요(Spotless Mind)", written by Luvan and Wonderkid, tells a story of a young man struggling to cope with the aftereffects of a painful break-up. The track is a song that highlights Jung Joon Young's deep emotional voice with a rock ballad sound. The name of the track was inspired by the American movie Eternal Sunshine on the Spotless Mind, which takes listeners on a movie-like experience with his imaginative and sorrowful melody and lyrics.
A representative for the singer stated, "Jung Joon-young has strong opinions and also has a love for rock, which is reflected directly in his debut single. Through his music listeners would be able to know what kind of person Jung is, and what kind of music he would like to play."

Title track : "이별10분전 (The Sense of An Ending)"

Jung Joon Young's debut mini album's title song is a rock ballad song called "이별10분전 The Sense of an Ending". The song was produced by SCORE, who previously worked with artists such as Younha and Primary, and emphasizes Jung Joon Young's deep husky voice and a live band sound. The song features sad lyrics and Jung Joon Young's poignant vocals, just in time for the chilly autumn weather. According to Jung Joon Young, "We tried to minimize the electronic sound, and instead tried to create an authentic sound, as if you are listening to a live band. This song features a man's emotional voice as he looks forward to a farewell, and hopefully brings back the male vocal's rock ballad genre. We wanted to preserve the classic aspect of the genre, as well as tastefully develop it into a song to fit in with 2013's modern sound."

Self-created songs : "Take Off Mask" and "아는 번호 (Missed Call)"

He proved his ability as a musician by participating in composing and writing lyrics on two songs.
He composed the western style rock song "Take Off Mask" with Lee Ji Hoon, which features his unique musical style and slightly exaggerates his vocal color. 
He also participated in writing lyrics and composing the rock ballad "아는 번호 (Missed Call)" which expresses the depressed feeling of a man who still misses a former girlfriend with a dark and sad melody and lyrics. It combines a band sound and orchestra sound perfectly.

Other singles : "Be Stupid" and "정말? (Really?)"

"Be Stupid" is an upbeat song with a rock punk beat that includes a Japanese rock feeling and its lyrics seem to talk about his own style. It expresses  free, easy-going, and self-satisfied life style "Be Stupid".
"정말? (Really?)" is a bright pop rock with a band sound that blends beautifully with string arrangements.

Track listing

Music video

Charts

Single chart
"병이에요 (Spotless Mind)"

"이별10분전 (The Sense of An Ending)"

Album chart : 1st Mini Album

Album sales

Release history

References

2013 EPs
Korean-language EPs
Stone Music Entertainment EPs